Khab Dar Bidari (Sleep While Awake) is the first solo studio album by Persian rock singer Farhad Mehrad. It was released in 1993. The album combines with mixing Persian and English songs.

Track listing

References

External links

Farhad Mehrad albums
1993 albums
Persian-language albums